Outwood Academy Bishopsgarth (formerly Bishopsgarth School) is a comprehensive secondary school with academy status in the Bishopsgarth area of Stockton on Tees, England. It has a mixed intake of both boys and girls, ages 11–16, and had 537 pupils on roll in January 2017.

The school is operated by Outwood Grange Academies Trust, and the current principal is Sheriden Hutchinson-Jones. Ralph Pickles is the current chair of governors.

History
Bishopsgarth School was a community school operated by the local education authority.

Following an inspection in January 2016, Ofsted rated Bishopsgarth School as "requires improvement" in all areas. In June, the school began working with support from Outwood Grange Academies Trust to tackle low-level disruptive behaviour. On the first day of new "no-nonsense" rules coming into force, 15 pupils received fixed-term exclusions for various misdemeanours.

In November 2016 the school converted to academy status, joining Outwood Grange Academies Trust, and changed its name to Outwood Academy Bishopsgarth.

In January 2019, Ofsted published its first inspection report of the academy since its conversion to Outwood Academy Bishopsgarth.

Academics
This an 11-16 academy rated good by Ofsted;
a  medium-sized school with that says it big plans for the future. Ofsted noted in the report that it is ‘being rapidly transformed through the highly effective actions of leaders and the trust.’
it is experimenting with a vertical curriculum centering on a two-year Key Stage 3 and a three-year Key Stage 4, that personalises learning. It supports fast-tracking and 
workshops to provide accelerated routes for the most ambitious students, while giving all the time they need to  succeed through the extended Key Stage 4.

Years 7, 8
During Years 7 and 8, students study a 'broad and balanced curriculum' which includes English, maths and science as core subjects, with a range of expressive arts subjects, geography, history,  a PSRE programme that include religious education, computer science, technology, a modern foreign language and physical education. This fulfills the National Curriculum requirement.

Years 9, 10, and 11
Students will start studying GCSE or equivalent courses in Year 9. These will include English (including English Literature), mathematics and science (which includes physics, chemistry and biology). Students will also study physical education and the Life  PSRE programme. In addition, after much discussion students embark on their individualised Guided Pathway. They will be directed into various suitable options.  These courses each lead to qualifications a student will need for their future career choices.

From the three option columns they must choose one subject from this list: History (GCSE), Geography (GCSE), German (GCSE). Then two from : WJEC Hospitality and Catering (GCSE), OCR Child Development (Cambridge National), BTEC Tech Award in Business and Enterprise, BTEC Tech Award in Sport, Activity and Fitness.

Controversies
Outwood Academy Bishopsgarth excluded 34% of its pupils on fixed-term exclusions in 2017–2018, the second highest figure in the country, only to be beaten by Outwood Academy Ormesby who excluded 41%.

In 2019 former teachers at the school reported a practice of intimidating 'flattening the grass assemblies', which the trust denied.

Schoolsweek described what happened at a flattening the grass assembly  at Outwood Academy City Fields. They quoted a teacher.
“I’ve never seen anything like it. They were shouting in the faces of any children that were slouching.
“Those first assemblies were very, very harsh… The atmosphere was poisonous… The people that were in there were just downright nasty towards the pupils.”
 Again the trust denied the accusation.

After being threatened with a court action, the Trust is reviewing its use of consequence rooms and isolation booths in its 31 schools. Here pupils were required to sit in silence in isolation for six hours a day while receiving no teacher input. The Trust had issued 31,000 of these punishment orders to pupils across 14 schools in the trust in the 2017–18 academic year. 1,400 went to children receiving free school meals and 90 to children with education health and care (EHC) plans.

Notes

References

External links
 

Secondary schools in the Borough of Stockton-on-Tees
Bishopsgarth